Robert F. Fennell (born June 26, 1956, in Lynn, Massachusetts) is an American restaurateur and politician who owns the Capitol Diner and represented the 10th Essex district in the Massachusetts House of Representatives from 1995 to 2016.

References 

1956 births
Democratic Party members of the Massachusetts House of Representatives
Politicians from Lynn, Massachusetts
Salem State University alumni
American restaurateurs
Living people